The Star of David theorem is a mathematical result on arithmetic properties of binomial coefficients.  It was discovered by Henry W. Gould in 1972.

Statement 
The greatest common divisors of the binomial coefficients forming each of the two triangles in the Star of David shape in Pascal's triangle are equal:

Examples

Rows 8, 9, and 10 of Pascal's triangle are

{|
|- 
| || || ||1|| ||8|| ||28|| ||56|| ||70|| ||56|| ||28|| ||8|| ||1||
|-
| || ||1|| ||9|| ||36|| ||84|| ||126|| ||126|| ||84|| ||36|| ||9|| ||1||
|-
| ||1|| ||10|| ||45|| ||120|| ||210|| ||252|| ||210|| ||120|| ||45|| ||10|| ||1||
|}

For n=9, k=3 or n=9, k=6, the element 84 is surrounded by, in sequence, the elements 28, 56, 126, 210, 120, 36. Taking alternating values, we have gcd(28, 126, 120) = 2 = gcd(56, 210, 36).

The element 36 is surrounded by the sequence 8, 28, 84, 120, 45, 9, and taking alternating values we have gcd(8, 84, 45) = 1 = gcd(28, 120, 9).

Generalization

The above greatest common divisor also equals  Thus in the above example for the element 84 (in its rightmost appearance), we also have gcd(70, 56, 28, 8) = 2. This result in turn has further generalizations.

Related results
The two sets of three numbers which the Star of David theorem says have equal greatest common divisors also have equal products. For example, again observing that the element 84 is surrounded by, in sequence, the elements 28, 56, 126, 210, 120, 36, and again taking alternating values, we have 28×126×120 = 26×33×5×72 = 56×210×36. This result can be confirmed by writing out each binomial coefficient in factorial form, using

See also 
 List of factorial and binomial topics

References 

 H. W. Gould, "A New Greatest Common Divisor Property of The Binomial Coefficients", Fibonacci Quarterly 10 (1972), 579–584.
 Star of David theorem, from MathForum. 
 Star of David theorem, blog post.

External links 

 Demonstration of the Star of David theorem, in Mathematica. 

Theorems in discrete mathematics
Combinatorics
Factorial and binomial topics